Young Man's Fancy is a 1939 British historical comedy film directed by Robert Stevenson and starring Anna Lee, Griffith Jones, and Seymour Hicks. The screenplay concerns an aristocratic Englishman who is unhappily engaged to a brewery heiress but meets Ada, an Irish human cannonball, during a visit to a music hall and falls in love with her. Together they are trapped in Paris during the Siege of Paris (1870-1871).

The screenplay was written by Roland Pertwee and Stevenson, with additional dialogue by Rodney Ackland and E.V.H. Emmett. The character of Ada, written especially for Anna Lee by Stevenson, her husband, is "based on Zazel, the original 'human cannon ball', who thrilled London audiences in the [eighteen] nineties by being shot from a cannon" — however, "for the purposes of the film … the period [of the screenplay] has been put back to the seventies".

Cast

See also 
 Rossa Matilda Richter

Notes

External links

1939 films
1939 romantic comedy films
1930s historical comedy films
1930s English-language films
British romantic comedy films
British historical comedy films
Ealing Studios films
British black-and-white films
Franco-Prussian War films
Films set in England
Films set in London
Films set in Paris
Films set in France
Films set in the 19th century
Films set in the 1870s
Films directed by Robert Stevenson
British historical romance films
1930s historical romance films
1930s British films